Kuo-Chu Chang is an electrical engineer.

Chang completed his master's degree in electrical engineering in 1983 and his doctorate in the same subject in 1986, both at the University of Connecticut. After obtaining his master's, Chang began working as a senior research scientist for Booz Allen Hamilton. He left Booz Allen in 1992 for a faculty position at George Mason University. He has edited the Tracking/Navigation Systems (1993–1996) and the Large Scale Systems (1996–2006) sections of the IEEE Transactions on Aerospace and Electronic Systems, and served as associate editor for the IEEE Transactions on Systems, Man, and Cybernetics (2002–2007). He is affiliated with GMU's Institute for Digital Innovation and the Volgenau School of Engineering. Chang was elected a fellow of the IEEE in 2010.

References

Living people
Electrical engineers
University of Connecticut alumni
George Mason University faculty
20th-century engineers
21st-century engineers
Fellow Members of the IEEE
Booz Allen Hamilton people
Year of birth missing (living people)